Laurell Barker (born April 20, 1979), also known mononymously as Laurell, is a Canadian singer and songwriter currently residing in Malmö, Sweden. She has co-written songs with numerous artists, including Twice, Eleni Foureira and Oh My Girl. She is also known for co-writing songs competing in the Eurovision Song Contest and its national selections.

She won a Juno Award in 2018 for Dance Recording of the Year. In 2019, Barker was the first female songwriter to have three songs competing in a Eurovision final.

Discography

As main artist

As featured artist

Songwriting discography

Eurovision Song Contest entries

National final entries

Eurovision: You Decide entries (United Kingdom)

Melodifestivalen entries (Sweden)

Die Grosse Entscheidungsshow entries (Switzerland)

Eurovizijos Atranka entries (Lithuania)

Dansk Melodi Grand Prix entries (Denmark)

National final entries (Germany)

Melodi Grand Prix entries (Norway)

Beovizija entries (Serbia)

Dora entries (Croatia)

Eurosong entries (Belgium)

Notes

References 

1979 births
Living people
Canadian women songwriters
Canadian pop singers
21st-century Canadian women singers
Juno Award for Dance Recording of the Year winners
Musicians from British Columbia
People from North Vancouver
Canadian expatriates in Sweden
Melodifestivalen contestants of 2023